Charles Musonda (born 22 August 1969) is a Zambian former professional footballer. At his peak, he played as a midfielder for Belgian club Anderlecht.

Career
His debut as a professional for Zambia came in 1988 against Ghana in Lusaka which Zambia won 2–0 and Musonda did not disappoint, tellingly imposing himself on the game. He was one of the star players at the 1988 Summer Olympics in Seoul as Zambia reached the quarter finals, trouncing Italy and Guatemala with 4–0 scorelines along the way.

When a plane carrying the Zambian National team developed problems and plunged into the Atlantic Ocean off the coast of Gabon on 28 April 1993 killing all 30 people on board including crew members and Football Association of Zambia president Michael Mwape, Musonda was traumatised as he was supposed to have been on the same plane. According to one report, he was called up by the national coach Godfrey Chitalu for the 1994 World Cup qualification match against Senegal but Anderlecht's team manager, Michel Verschueren, asked him to refuse the invitation and to play for Anderlecht, which Musonda did and therefore missed the fateful flight, though in an interview Musonda himself disclosed that when he first heard about the plane crash, he was in bed recovering from knee surgery and that was what saved his life. He would undergo seven operations on the same knee between 1991 and 1996.

Musonda returned to Belgium and first worked as a youth coach at AA Ghent before moving  to Anderlecht to become a youth coach, scout and assistant trainer for the first team.

Personal life
Musonda has three sons Lamisha,  Tika, and Charly Jr. who all featured for Anderlecht's youth teams. Musonda's son Lamisha featured in the goal project with David Beckham. In June 2012, they joined Chelsea's youth ranks.

Honours

Club 
Anderlecht

 Belgian First Division: 1990–91, 1992–93, 1993–94, 1994–95
 Belgian Cup: 1987–88, 1988–89, 1993–94
Belgian Super Cup: 1985, 1987, 1993, 1995
 European Cup Winners' Cup: 1989-90 (runners-up)

References

Living people
1969 births
People from Mufulira
Zambian footballers
Zambia international footballers
Olympic footballers of Zambia
Footballers at the 1988 Summer Olympics
1986 African Cup of Nations players
Zambian expatriate footballers
Cercle Brugge K.S.V. players
Association football midfielders
R.S.C. Anderlecht players
FC Energie Cottbus players
USISL players
Sacramento Scorpions players
Belgian Pro League players
Expatriate footballers in Belgium
Expatriate footballers in Germany
Expatriate soccer players in the United States